Minnesund is a village in the municipality of Eidsvoll, Norway. It is located at the southern end of lake Mjøsa. As of 2005, its population is 488.

References

Villages in Akershus